Sentinel-3  is an Earth observation heavy satellite series developed by the European Space Agency as part of the Copernicus Programme. It currently (as of 2020) consists of 2 satellites: Sentinel-3A and Sentinel-3B. After initial commissioning, each satellite was handed over to EUMETSAT for the routine operations phase of the mission. Two recurrent satellites— Sentinel-3C and Sentinel-3D— will follow in approximately 2024 and 2028 respectively to ensure continuity of the Sentinel-3 mission.

The each Sentinel-3 satellite is designed to operate for seven years in a sun-synchronous low earth orbit and uses multiple sensors to measure topography, temperature, marine ecosystems, water quality, pollution, and other features for ocean forecasting and environmental and monitoring.

Overview
On 14 April 2008, the European Space Agency and Thales Alenia Space signed a  contract to build the first GMES Sentinel-3 in its Cannes Mandelieu Space Center. Bruno Berruti led the team that was responsible for delivering the Copernicus Sentinel-3 satellites from the drawing board into orbit. The satellite platform was delivered to France for final integration in 2013. The communications systems were completed by Thales Alenia Space España in early 2014.

Sentinel-3A was subsequently launched on 16 February 2016 on a Rokot vehicle from the Plesetsk Cosmodrome, located near Arkhangelsk, Russia. This first launch was followed by the launch of Sentinel-3B on 25 April 2018, also aboard a Rokot. Each satellite is designed to operate for 7 years.

The Sentinel-3 mission's main objective is to measure sea-surface topography, land- and sea-surface temperature, and land- and ocean-surface colour with accuracy in support of ocean forecasting systems, and for environmental and climate monitoring. Sentinel-3 builds directly on the heritage pioneered by ERS-2 and Envisat satellites. Near-real time data will be provided for ocean forecasting, sea-ice charting, and maritime safety services on the state of the ocean surface, including surface temperature, marine ecosystems, water quality and pollution monitoring.

A pair of Sentinel-3 satellites will enable a short revisit time of less than two days for the OLCI instrument and less than one day for SLSTR at the equator. This will be achieved using both Sentinel-3A and Sentinel-3B satellites in conjunction. The satellite orbit provides a 27-day repeat for the topography package, with a 4-day sub-cycle.

Objectives
Mission objectives are:
Measure sea-surface topography, sea-surface height and significant wave height
Measure ocean and land-surface temperature
Measure ocean and land-surface colour
Monitor sea and land ice topography
Sea-water quality and pollution monitoring
Inland water monitoring, including rivers and lakes
Aid marine weather forecasting with acquired data
Climate monitoring and modelling
Land-use change monitoring
Forest cover mapping
Fire detection
Weather forecasting
Measuring Earth's thermal radiation for atmospheric applications

Mission characteristics
Role: Earth observation satellite
Launch mass: Appx. 
Orbit: Sun-synchronous
Altitude: 
Inclination: 98.6°
Local time of Descending Node: 10:00 a.m.
Orbit cycle: ~100 minutes
Nominal duration: 7.5 years

Instruments
Sentinel-3 makes use of multiple sensing instruments:

SLSTR
It measures in nine spectral channels and two additional bands optimised for fire monitoring. The first six spectral bands cover the visible and near-infrared (VNIR) spectrum as well as the short-wave infrared (SWIR) spectrum; VNIR for bands 1 to 3, and SWIR for bands 4 to 6. For the SLSTR instrument on the Sentinel 3, calibration on-board is one of the most detrimental objectives for the thermal and infrared channels. This instrument has two black bodies that were targeted, one at lower temperature than predicted, and one at a higher temperature. Therefore, the range in between the high and low temperatures of these black bodies measures the ocean surface temperature.

OLCI 
OLCI (Ocean and Land Colour Instrument) is a medium-resolution imaging spectrometer that uses five cameras to provide a wide field of view.  The OLCI is an along-track or "push broom" scanner, meaning that the sensor array is arranged perpendicular to the path of flight. This method essentially eliminates the scale distortion near the edge of an image that is common with across-track or "whisk broom" scanners. OLCI has 21 spectral bands with wavelengths ranging from the optical to the near-infrared. Bands vary in width from 400 nm to 1020 nm, and serve a variety of different purposes, including measuring water vapour absorption, aerosol levels, and chlorophyll absorption.  SLSTR and OLCI are optical instruments with an overlap of their swath path, allowing for new combined applications. Due to climate changing factors, inland coastal regions have become an increased area of concern and from 2002 to 2012, the Medium Resolution Imaging Spectrometer (MERIS) provided quality observations for analysis. The OLCI improves upon the MERIS in that it was built with six additional spectral bands, higher-end signal to noise ratio (SNR), reduced solar glaring, a maximum of 300 m spatial resolution, and increased ground coverage allowing it to sense cyanobacterial levels within inland coastal ecosystems.   This is currently the only sensor in space able to detect cyanobacteria.

SRAL
SRAL (Synthetic Aperture Radar Altimeter) is the main topographic instrument to provide accurate topography measurements over sea ice, ice sheets, rivers and lakes. It uses dual-frequency Ku and C band and is supported by a microwave radiometer (MWR) for atmospheric correction and a DORIS receiver for orbit positioning. This allows the instrument, which is based on legacy missions such as CryoSat and the Jason missions, to provide a 300-meter resolution and a total range error of 3 cm. The instrument operates its pulse repetition frequency at 1.9 kHz (low-resolution mode - LRM, real aperture radar) and 17.8 kHz (synthetic aperture radar - SAR).

DORIS
DORIS (Doppler Orbitography and Radiopositioning Integrated by Satellite) is a receiver for orbit positioning.

MWR
MWR (Microwave Radiometer) measures water vapour and cloud water content and the thermal radiation emitted by the Earth.

LRR
LRR (Laser retroreflector) accurately locates the satellite in orbit using a laser ranging system. When used in combination with SRAL, DORIS, MWR, they will acquire detailed topographic measurements of the ocean and in-land water.

GNSS
GNSS (Global Navigation Satellite System) provides precise orbit determination and can track multiple satellites simultaneously.

Satellite operation and data flow
Sentinel-3 is operated by the European Space Operations Centre (ESA) and Eumetsat. The in-orbit operations for Sentinel-3 are coordinated by Eumetsat in Darmstadt, Germany. This includes monitoring the health of the satellite and the instruments, and coordinates housekeeping telemetry and commands at the main flight control center in Darmstadt, Germany. ESA maintains a backup flight control center at a ground station in Kiruna, Sweden. In addition, the ESA operates an x-band core station in Svalbard, Norway. This station is responsible for receiving the data collected by Sentinel-3.  The data is then analysed by the Sentinel Collaborative Ground Segment and compiled into the Copernicus Space Component (CSC). The CSC is an earth observation program run by the ESA with the objective of providing high quality continuous monitoring of the earth.

Applications
The applications of Sentinel-3 are diverse.  Using the collection of sensors on-board Sentinel-3 is able to detect ocean and land temperature and colour change. The Ocean and Land Color Instrument (OLCI) has a  resolution with 21 distinct bands allowing global coverage in less than four days. This sensor can then be used to by researches to do water quality and land-monitoring research. The satellite also has the ability to monitor the temperature of the sea, land and ice through the Sea and Land Surface Temperature Radiometer (SLSTR).  Sentinel-3 also had the ability to detect changes in sea-surface height and sea-ice using the synthetic aperture radar altimeter and the microwave radiometer, two of the most complex sensors on the satellite.

The observations acquired by the mission will be used to in conjunction with other ocean-observing missions to contribute to the Global Ocean Observing System (GOOS) which aims to create a permanent system of ocean observation.
Ocean colour and land reflectance data
Sea, land and ice surface temperature
Active fire and burnt area monitoring
Sea surface topography data

Gallery

References

External links

 Sentinel-3 website by EUMETSAT
 Sentinel-3 website  by European Space Agency
 Sentinel-3 website by eoPortal
 Sentinel-3 NRT visualisation website by OceanDataLab

Copernicus Programme
Earth observation satellites of the European Space Agency
Satellite series
Earth satellite radar altimeters